Line War is a 2008 science fiction novel by Neal Asher.  It is the fifth and final novel in the Gridlinked sequence, although other novels exist in the same universe outside this sequence. It received positive reviews by critics.

References

2008 British novels
2008 science fiction novels
British science fiction novels
Tor Books books